Euclid Bertrand (born July 23, 1974) is a Dominican footballer playing with Dublanc FC in the Dominica Premier League.

Playing career 
Bertrand played in 1995 with London City in the Canadian National Soccer League.  In 1999, he returned to his homeland to play with Northern Bombers FC in the Dominica Premiere League. He returned to London City for the 2009 season. In 2016, he signed with Dublanc FC in the Dominica Premier League.

International career  
Bertrand has played for the Dominica national football team since 2008.

References 

1974 births
Living people
Dominica international footballers
Dominica footballers
London City players
Canadian National Soccer League players
Canadian Soccer League (1998–present) players
Association football midfielders
Expatriate soccer players in Canada
Dominica expatriate sportspeople in Canada
Dominica expatriate footballers